The October Tour was a concert tour by Irish rock band U2 that took place in 1981 and 1982 to support the band's second studio album, October, which was released in October 1981.

Itinerary
The tour followed a similar pattern to the previous tour and consisted of five legs, three in Europe and two in North America. The first leg began in Ireland in the August 1981 and ended in Berlin at the start of November, in total, 33 concerts were held. Soon after the first European leg, U2 travelled to North America to play 23 shows over the course of a month. Another European leg was held between December 1981 and February 1982 before heading back to the USA to fulfill the longest leg of the tour. The fourth leg ran from February through to April and was made up of 32 shows, considerably less than the European and American legs of the Boy tour. After a short break, the tour finished with a final 9 shows in Europe.

Setlist
The setlist varied each night throughout the tour, with eight songs from October and ten from Boy being played.  Songs such as "Rejoice", "Another Time, Another Place", "With a Shout (Jerusalem)", and "Fire" were dropped from the setlist towards the end of the tour.  "Gloria" was used as the opener at almost every show, whilst "The Ocean" (used as the opener for the previous tour) was played predominantly as the closing song.

Tour dates

References

U2 concert tours
1981 concert tours
1982 concert tours